Black ash is a common name for several plants and may refer to:

 Acer negundo, native to North America
 Fraxinus nigra, native to North America
 Eucalyptus sieberi, native to Australia